Sparganothoides lentiginosana, the lentiginos moth, is a species of moth of the family Tortricidae. It is found in the United States from Maryland to Florida, west to Arkansas, Texas and Oklahoma, ranging south to Mexico in Tamaulipas and Veracruz. It is found in a wide range of habitats, ranging from urban areas to mixed pine-deciduous woodlands at low elevations.

The length of the forewings is 6–6.5 mm for males and 6.3–7.4 mm for females. The ground color of the forewings is yellowish brown to golden yellow (or sometimes brownish orange) with orange or brown scaling. The hindwings are variable, ranging from pale yellowish white to yellowish grey or grey. Adults have been recorded year round, except November and December. There are several generations per year.

The larvae have been reared on Malus sylvestris and Achillea millefolium. First instar larvae web the edges of the leaves of their host plant.

References

Moths described in 1879
Sparganothoides